Laccophilus vacaensis is a species of predaceous diving beetle in the family Dytiscidae. It is found in North America and the Neotropics.

Subspecies
These three subspecies belong to the species Laccophilus vacaensis:
 Laccophilus vacaensis chihuahuae Zimmerman, 1970
 Laccophilus vacaensis thermophilus Zimmerman, 1970
 Laccophilus vacaensis vacaensis Young, 1953

References

Further reading

 
 

Dytiscidae
Articles created by Qbugbot
Beetles described in 1953